The Wes Montgomery Trio (a.k.a. A Dynamic New Sound) is an album by the American jazz guitarist Wes Montgomery, released in 1959. The track "Missile Blues" is named after the club in Indianapolis where Montgomery played before moving to New York City to record for Riverside. At this club, he met Riverside's record producer Orrin Keepnews. The album was reissued on the Original Jazz Classics label.

Reception 

In his AllMusic review, music critic Ronnie D. Lankford, Jr. wrote: "The only drawback is that the accompaniment, which though solid, doesn't seem to perfectly match his guitar style... Montgomery's performance... was a revolution in technique and execution. Suddenly, out of nowhere, a 36-year-old guitarist re-imagines the jazz guitar solo."

Track listing
"'Round Midnight" (Thelonious Monk, Cootie Williams) – 4:58
"Yesterdays" (Otto Harbach, Jerome Kern) – 3:20
"The End of a Love Affair" (Edward Redding) – 3:18
"Whisper Not" (Benny Golson) – 4:40
"Ecaroh" (Horace Silver) – 3:00
"Satin Doll" [Alternate take] (Duke Ellington, Johnny Mercer, Billy Strayhorn) – 4:08
"Satin Doll" (Ellington, Mercer, Strayhorn) – 3:58
"Missile Blues" [Alternate take] (Wes Montgomery) – 4:37
"Missile Blues" (Montgomery) – 6:04
"Too Late Now" (Burton Lane, Alan Jay Lerner) – 4:55
"Jingles" (Montgomery) – 5:31

Tracks 6 & 8 do not appear on the original album.

Personnel
 Wes Montgomery – guitar
 Melvin Rhyne – organ
 Paul Parker – drums
Production notes:
 Orrin Keepnews – producer
 Jack Higgins – engineer

Session information
Cuts 1, 5, 6, 7, 8 recorded at Reeves Sound Studios, NYC, October 5, 1959
Cuts 2, 3, 4, 9, 10, 11 recorded at Reeves Sound Studios, NYC, October 6, 1959

Releases

Riverside CRLP 1156 (original album), Riverside RLP 12-310, Riverside OJCCD-034-2

References

Wes Montgomery albums
1959 albums
Albums produced by Orrin Keepnews
Riverside Records albums